Luis de la Puente (also D'Aponte, de Ponte, Dupont) (11 November 1554 – 16 February 1624) was a Spanish Jesuit theologian and ascetic writer. A few years after his death, the Sacred Congregation of Rites admitted the cause of his beatification and canonization.

Life
Puente was born in Valladolid.  Having entered the Society of Jesus, he studied under Francisco Suarez, and professed philosophy at Salamanca. He was forced by bad health to retire from duties, and took up writing. Ordained priest in 1580, he became the spiritual director of Marina de Escobar, in which office he continued till his death. In 1599 he devoted himself to the care of the plague-stricken in Villagarcia.  He died in Valladolid.

Theology
Though not reckoned among Spanish classics, his works are so replete with practical spirituality that they claim for him a place among the most eminent masters of asceticism. "[H]e was the architect of a practical theology of spiritual guidance that incorporated different strains of Augustinianism and Thomism with Dionysian mystical theology."

Works
Besides a commentary in Latin on the Canticle of Canticles, he wrote (in Spanish):

"Life of Father Baltasar Alvarez" (Vida del P. Baltasar Alvarez. Madrid 1615; Vita P. Balthassaris Alvarez. Coloniae 1616 ); 
"Life of Marina de Escobar"; 
"Spiritual Directory for Confession, Communion and the Sacrifice of the Mass"; 
"The Christian Life" (4 vols.), and 
"Meditations on the Mysteries of Our Holy Faith", by which he is best known.
"On the perfection of various states of life," (The following links are in Spanish)
Volume One
Volume Two: Of the Sacraments of Baptism and Confirmation and the Perfection practiced in them
Volume Three: On Virginity and religion and following the Counsels
Volume Three: On the States, Offices, and Ministries of Church Hierarchy

References

External links
His works available at archive.org
Luis de la Puente in the Historical Archives of the Pontifical Gregorian University

1554 births
1624 deaths
16th-century Spanish Jesuits
16th-century male writers
17th-century Spanish Jesuits
Venerated Catholics
17th-century Spanish Roman Catholic theologians
17th-century venerated Christians
16th-century Spanish Roman Catholic theologians
University of Salamanca alumni
17th-century male writers